New City College (NCC) is a large college of further education with campuses in East London and Essex. The college was formed in 2016 with the amalgamation of separate colleges, beginning with the merger between Tower Hamlets College and Hackney Community College, followed by the gradual additions of Redbridge College, Epping Forest College, and both Havering College of Further and Higher Education and Havering Sixth Form College. It is the second largest provider of post-16 education in the country since 2019.

Courses
Various vocational and academic programmes are offered by the constituent colleges of New City Colleges such as A levels, BTECs, Diplomas, ESOL programmes and Access courses. In addition, certain colleges have currently or in the past provided some higher education courses in conjunction with the University of East London.

History and sites
The college has 9 buildings and 5 campuses around London and Essex: Redbridge (Ilford and Chadwell Heath), Tower Hamlets (Poplar and Arbour Square), Hackney, Epping Forest (Debden) and Havering (Ardleigh Green, Rainham and Hornchurch). All of these were inherited from its predecessors.

Tower Hamlets

The largest building of the Tower Hamlets campus is on Poplar High Street, about 700 m north of Canary Wharf; the others are at Arbour Square, Bethnal Green and the TowerSkills on East India Dock Road.

The college is housed in the former building of the School of Marine Engineering and Navigation established by the London County Council opened in 1906. This later evolved into Poplar Technical College, which retained a maritime focus. Tower Hamlets College (THC) was established in 1990.

The College faced increasing competition at sixth form provision from local schools in Tower Hamlets and underwent an OFSTED inspection in December 2013 which awarded the College good college status (Ofsted, December 2013)  As of 2009/10 the college had 18,986 enrolments, of which 66% were adults age 19 and over.

The largest ethnic group in the college is Bangladeshi, predominantly Muslims. The college hosts one of the Great Britain's largest Islamic society of College. Tower Hamlets College was featured in the book of The Islamist by Ed Husain, who was a former president of the Islamic Society at THC and explains the growing Islamic fundamentalism of Muslim students part of the Islamic Society during 1992.

Hackney

Its campus is in Falkirk Street in Hoxton, backing onto Hoxton Street. When the campus opened in 1996, it was Britain's largest capital further education building project.

The college was originally named Hackney College when it was formed in 1974 by the amalgamation of Hackney and Stoke Newington College of Further Education with those sites of Poplar Technical College that had been established in Hackney. It was initially run by Inner London Education Authority (ILEA) and, following that, by Hackney Council, when it was renamed. For a few years it was known as The Community College Shoreditch, but later reverted to the name Hackney Community College (dating from the process known as "incorporation" in 1993 when it was formed from the merger of Hackney College, Hackney Sixth Form Centre and Hackney Adult Education Institute, as a result of the Further and Higher Education Act 1992.) In August 2016, Hackney Community College merged with Tower Hamlets to create a more responsive and financially robust larger organisation, named New City College.

It is home to the Tech City Apprenticeship, the London Technical Fashion Academy, the London City Hospitality Centre and its training restaurant, Open Kitchen.

HCC's SPACe (Sport and Performing Arts Centre) was funded by Sport England as a centre of excellence in cricket and basketball. SPACe was home to London United Basketball and is still the base for the Hackney Community College Basketball Academy, as well as academies in other sports. SPACe was used as a training camp for basketball during the London 2012 Olympic and Paralympic Games.

Previous Hackney institutions
'Hackney College' has also been widely used (by Pevsner and others) to refer specifically to Brooke House, until September 2002 one of the Community College's sites. This has now become BSix Sixth Form College.

The modern version of the term should also be distinguished from previous Hackney Colleges:
 One name for the dissenting academy set up by Calvinists in Homerton (in the parish of Hackney) in 1786, also known in various accounts as Homerton Academy, or Homerton College. In these years it attracted some notable students, including William Hazlitt. In 1850 it split into two parts. The teacher training component moved to Cambridge, where it is still known as Homerton College; the theological functions stayed in London as part of the three-college merger that created New College London.
 One name for the seminary co-founded by George Collison (b. 1772- d. 1847). It was also known as Hackney Academy or Hackney Theological Seminary, or Hackney Itineracy, but became best known as the Hackney College after 1871, a name which stuck even after its 1887 move to Finchley Road in Hampstead, North London. Its principal at about this time was Peter Taylor Forsyth.

Both of these merged in 1900, becoming the University of London's first Faculty of Theology. In 1924 this became, by Act of Parliament, a constituent college known as Hackney and New College, the two names by which its disparate buildings throughout north London were commonly known. In 1934 new premises were planned. In 1936, the name of the college was simplified to New College London, harking back to the Congregationalist merger of 1850.

Redbridge

The Redbridge Campus has two sites in Ilford, one in the town centre and another next to King George Hospital.

Redbridge College began life as Redbridge Technical College on 2 June 1970. It offered vocational courses in a range of subjects. It was once a major centre for deaf students or those with learning difficulties. The college merged into New City College in 2017.

Epping Forest
The Epping Forest campus is located in Borders Lane in Debden, a suburb of Loughton.

Epping Forest College was founded in 1989 as a tertiary college after the re-organisation of post-16 education in south-west Essex. It was created from the Loughton College of Further Education and the sixth forms from seven local secondary schools. Due to financial strains, the college merged with New City College in 2018, a move that was protested by Epping Forest District council fearing it would lose community focus.

Havering Colleges
Havering Colleges is a constituent college formed from Havering College of Further and Higher Education and Havering Sixth Form College. Collectively the Havering Colleges, they retain their individual identities as part of the New City College group.

Notable alumni
 Kate Osamor - Labour Party politician (Hackney College)
 Darius Defoe - Newcastle Eagles player (Hackney College)
Dire Straits guitarist and singer Mark Knopfler lectured at the Epping Forest site when it was known as Loughton College

References

External links
 official website

Educational institutions established in 2016
2016 establishments in England
Further education colleges in London
Further education colleges in Essex
Education in the London Borough of Tower Hamlets
Education in the London Borough of Hackney
Education in the London Borough of Redbridge
Education in the London Borough of Havering
Learning and Skills Beacons
Loughton